Alexander Stanislavovich Romanov (born 6 January 2000) is a Russian professional ice hockey defenceman for the New York Islanders of the National Hockey League (NHL). Romanov was selected by the Montreal Canadiens with the 38th overall pick in the 2018 NHL Entry Draft.

Playing career
After two seasons playing in the KHL, Romanov was signed to a three-year, entry-level contract by the Montreal Canadiens on 13 July 2020. Making his debut with the team for the COVID-shortened 2020–21 season, Romanov played in 54 of 56 regular season games. However, he took to the ice in only four of the 22 games in the Canadiens' deep playoff run to the 2021 Stanley Cup Finals. On 5 July 2021, he became the youngest defenseman in Canadiens history to score a goal in the Stanley Cup Finals.

On 7 July 2022, during the 2022 NHL Entry Draft, Romanov was traded by the Canadiens, along with a fourth-round pick, to the New York Islanders in exchange for a first-round pick (13th overall). Canadiens general manager Kent Hughes said it was "very difficult" to trade Romanov, but that it was a necessary step in a series of trades to acquire centreman Kirby Dach from the Chicago Blackhawks.

International play

 

 
 

Romanov represented Russia at the 2019 IIHF World Junior Championship in Vancouver and Victoria, British Columbia, Canada. He finished with one goal and seven assists, anchoring the Russian defence en route to a bronze medal. Romanov was named the best defenceman of the tournament by the IIHF Directorate and was voted to the All-Star team.

Personal life
Romanov's maternal grandfather is Zinetula Bilyaletdinov, who played for the Soviet national team from 1974 to 1987 and coached the Russian national ice hockey team from 2011 to 2014. His father is former KHL player Stanislav Nikolaevich Romanov.

In October 2020, Romanov married longtime girlfriend and former rhythmic gymnast Sofia Krasovskaya.

In February 2023, Romanov and his wife Sofia welcomed their first child, a baby girl.

Career statistics

Regular season and playoffs

International

Awards and honors

References

External links
 

2000 births
Living people
Ice hockey people from Moscow
HC CSKA Moscow players
Krasnaya Armiya (MHL) players
Montreal Canadiens draft picks
Montreal Canadiens players
New York Islanders players
Russian ice hockey defencemen